Platanthera yosemitensis, the Yosemite bog orchid, is a species of orchid that is endemic to nine wet montane meadows between the main stem and the South Fork of the Merced River in Yosemite National Park.

First collected in 1923, it was not recognized as a distinct species until 2007. The orchid has a foul smell that has variously been described as "corral of horses, asafetida, strong cheese, human feet, sweaty clothing, or simply disagreeable".

References

External links

National Parks Traveler article

yosemitensis
Endemic flora of California
Endemic orchids of the United States
Orchids of California
Flora of the Sierra Nevada (United States)
Yosemite National Park
Plants described in 2007